Romuald Boco (born 8 July 1985) is a footballer who last played as a midfielder for Leyton Orient. Born in France, he has represented Benin at full international level.

Club career

Accrington Stanley
Born in Bernay, Eure, Boco signed for Accrington Stanley just before the 2005 transfer deadline from Niort. He had the honour of scoring the first two Football League goals for Stanley, in a 2–1 win against Barnet. He instantly became a favourite among the fans who stated they were "loco for Boco.".

After returning from the 2008 African Cup of Nations, he requested his contract be terminated, due to Homesickness.

On 30 January 2016, Accrington Stanley announced that Boco had rejoined the club until Season End. He will take retake his 26 shirt as worn in his original stint with the club.

Sligo Rovers
On 11 February 2008, he signed for Sligo Rovers of the League of Ireland Premier Division.

His new manager Paul Cook, who he previously played with at Accrington Stanley, was happy with his latest signing ahead of his team's new campaign, "I didn't think I'd get him, I thought that he would be out of our reach but, thankfully we have secured him," said Cook.

"I don't want to put pressure on him, but I'm certain that the fans will see that he is the real deal and with the other signings we've made, I believe that we're in for a very exciting season."

He scored his first league goal for Sligo Rovers in a 3–1 win over Cobh Ramblers.
He helped Rovers to qualification for the UEFA Europa League, formerly known as the UEFA Cup.

On 7 June 2009, he expressed concern at the financial situation within the League of Ireland in an interview with the BBC. Boco left Sligo when his contract expired at the end of the 2009 season.

Boco was on trial with Doncaster Rovers in a bid to earn a contract with the championship club, however nothing materialised and he then went on trial with Football League Two side Burton Albion after his contract with Sligo Rovers ran out and he decided not to sign a new one.

Burton Albion
Boco joined Burton Albion on a deal until the end of the season on 24 February 2010.

Sligo Rovers return

Boco rejoined Sligo Rovers on 30 July 2010 signing a contract which will expire by the end of the 2010 season. He played a major part in helping Rovers win the 2010 FAI Ford Cup after being changed position a right or left winger. When he first signed for Sligo Rovers he was a striker that was sometimes used as a centre midfielder and then changed to right-back. on 23 November, Paul Cook admitted that it's doubtful Boco will signed a new contract after turning down the club's "final" offer.

Despite talks of the club and Boco agreeing terms, on 23 February 2011 Paul Cook announced that Boco would not be returning to the Showgrounds for the coming season.

Boco then went on to join Shanghai East Asia on a deal until the end of the season. After a promising first season in China, Boco rejoined Sligo Rovers on 19 December 2011 after talks with Paul Cook.

The move would be his third spell for the Sligo.

After consistently impressing during Sligo's pre-season fixtures, Boco scored his first goal back in the red of Sligo during the team's 2–0 win over Glentoran in the Setanta Cup Quarter Final first leg.

On 31 August 2012, it was announced Boco had re-joined former club Accrington Stanley on a one-year deal.

Accrington Stanley
He made a good start to his second stint at the Crown Ground, scoring vital goals in order to keep Stanley's League status. He has built a reputation for his tireless work rate and running. He has the perfect start to his second stint at Accrington scoring his first goal away to Cheltenham Town in September. Two more goals followed away to Chesterfield, Rochdale, Barnet, Fleetwood Town, Bradford City, Chesterfield again and Rochdale again. He is currently the top scorer for Accrington during this season.

He has once again become a firm fan favorite with his work rate and has been nominated for player of the year award.

Plymouth Argyle
Boco signed a one-year contract with Plymouth Argyle in July 2013, and made his debut in the club's first game of the new season at Southend United.

Chesterfield
Romuald signed for Chesterfield on 8 August 2014 on a non-contract basis. This once again reunited him with manager Paul Cook who he previously played under at Sligo and Accrington. Boco scored on his debut against Leyton Orient in a 2–1 victory for the Spireites.

Bharat FC
On 20 January 2015, Boco signed for Indian I-League newcomers Kalyani Bharat FC, as the club's marquee player. He debuted for the Pune based side against Dempo SC. He has appeared in all 20 league matches in the 2014-15 I-League season, under the coaching of Stuart Watkiss.

International career
Boco was part of the Beninese 2004 African Nations Cup team, who finished bottom of their group in the first round of the competition.

Boco and Benin finished third in 2005 African Youth Championship. He also scored a goal against Ivory Coast in the tournament. He has also represented Benin U20 team at the 2005 FIFA World Youth Championship under the coaching of Serge Devèze and appeared in all three group matches. Benin finished third in the Group A and bowed out of the tournament.

Boco captained Benin in the 2008 African Nations Cup in what was only the country's second time qualifying for the competition, and was part of the Beninese 2010 African Nations Cup team.

He scored his first and only goal for the national team on 11 February 2009 against Algeria in a friendly match, that ended as their 2–1 defeat. Between 2004 and 2013, Boco earned 50 caps for Benin internationally, scoring a goal.

Honours

International
Benin U20
African Youth Championship
 Third place (1): 2005

Club
Accrington Stanley
Conference Premier: 2005–06

Sligo Rovers
FAI Cup:  2010
League of Ireland Cup: 2010

Career statistics

Club

References

External links

 Romuald Boco Interview at irishtimes.com

1985 births
Living people
People from Bernay, Eure
Citizens of Benin through descent
Beninese footballers
Benin international footballers
French footballers
Association football midfielders
Chamois Niortais F.C. players
Accrington Stanley F.C. players
Sligo Rovers F.C. players
Burton Albion F.C. players
Shanghai Port F.C. players
Plymouth Argyle F.C. players
Bharat FC players
Portsmouth F.C. players
Havant & Waterlooville F.C. players
Ligue 2 players
China League One players
National League (English football) players
English Football League players
League of Ireland players
I-League players
2004 African Cup of Nations players
2008 Africa Cup of Nations players
2010 Africa Cup of Nations players
Beninese expatriate footballers
Beninese expatriate sportspeople in England
Beninese expatriate sportspeople in Ireland
Beninese expatriate sportspeople in China
Beninese expatriate sportspeople in India
French expatriate footballers
French sportspeople of Beninese descent
Expatriate footballers in England
Expatriate association footballers in the Republic of Ireland
Expatriate footballers in China
Expatriate footballers in India
Sportspeople from Eure
Footballers from Normandy
Black French sportspeople